Pak Phanang is a district (amphoe) of Nakhon Si Thammarat province, southern Thailand.

The name of district means 'sheltered mouth', referring to the mouth of the Pak Phanang River protected from the open sea by a long peninsula.

History 
During the thesaphiban administrative reforms the district was created in 1895 with the name Bia Sad (เบิ้ยซัด). On 22 March 1903 it was renamed Pak Phanang, a name first recorded for the area in 1665.

On 25 October 1962 Tropical Storm Harriet hit the district. The low Talumphuk peninsula to the north of the district was completely devastated, and even in the town Pak Phanang itself the storm surge made the water rise four metres. The flooding caused more than 1,000 fatalities and many more homeless. It is the most severe windstorm that has ever occurred in Thailand recorded.

Geography 

Neighboring districts are (from the south clockwise): Hua Sai, Chian Yai, Chaloem Phra Kiat and Mueang Nakhon Si Thammarat. To the east is the Gulf of Thailand.

The most striking geographical feature is the long elongated peninsula known as Laem Talumphuk ('toli shad cape'), which is formed of sand deposited by the predominantly northward current interacting with the outflow of the Pak Phanang River. The shallow bay formed by the peninsula is about 3 km wide at the mouth of the river and 10 km at the top of the peninsula. Originally the coastline of the bay consisted of tidal flats and mangrove forests, however a lot of the western coast had been converted into shrimp farms.

Economy
"Bird's nest condos" are said to dominate the skyline of the district. The purpose-built buildings were constructed to encourage nest building by edible-nest swiftlets when the price of edible bird's nests boomed following the 1997 Asian financial crisis. Pak Phanang has more than 500 farm buildings and each can generate income of around 50 million baht per year.  the export price of farmed nests is around 80,000 baht per kilo. Exported to China, the price doubles, selling for up to 160,000 baht per kilo. In Thailand, the number of nests extracted from caves is roughly 300 tonnes per year compared with just 100 tonnes from buildings, largely attributable to artificial birdhouses being illegal in Thailand. The business is "grey" and "underground".

Administration 
The district is divided into 18 sub-districts (tambons), which are further subdivided into 133 villages (mubans). Pak Phanang is a town (thesaban mueang) which includes tambon Pak Phanang and parts of tambon Hu Long, Pak Phanang Fang Tawan Tok, Pak Phanang Fang Tawan Ok, and Bang Phra. There are a further 17 tambon administrative organizations.

References

External links 
amphoe.com
Boromthanarat, S., Cobb, S., Lee, V. (1991). Coastal Management in Pak Phanang: A Historical Perspective of the Resources and Issues. Hat Yai, Thailand: Coastal Resources Institute, Prince of Songkla University 

Districts of Nakhon Si Thammarat province